Krishna Chandra Punetha (died 23 September 2020) was an Indian politician and a member of the Bharatiya Janata Party. Punetha was a member of the Uttarakhand Legislative Assembly from the Pithoragarh constituency in Pithoragarh district. Punetha served two terms as a member of the Assembly.

Punetha died at his home in Lohaghat on 23 September 2020.

References 

Year of birth missing
2020 deaths
Bharatiya Janata Party politicians from Uttarakhand
Place of birth missing
Members of the Uttarakhand Legislative Assembly
People from Pithoragarh district
21st-century Indian politicians